Live at Stern Grove is the fifth album released by Blame Sally. The album was recorded live in July 2009 at the Stern Grove Festival.

Track listing

Personnel 
 Monica Pasqual - Vocals, keyboard, accordion
 Jeri Jones - Mandolin, electric guitar, acoustic guitar, slide guitar
 Pam Delgado - Percussion, vocals
 Renee Harcourt - Acoustic guitar, vocals, harmonica
 Rob Strom - Bass

Production 
 Producer - Blame Sally
 Recorded by Tony Brooke
 Mixed by Wayne Skeen (Ninth Street Opus Studios)
 Mastered by Ken Lee
 Photography - Tom Erikson, Scott Wall
 Design - Renee Harcourt

References

2010 live albums
Live blues rock albums
Live folk rock albums
Blame Sally albums